Bobota may refer to:

 Bobota, Sălaj, a village in Sălaj County, Romania
 Bobota, Croatia, a village near Trpinja, Vukovar-Syrmia County, Croatia
 Bobota Canal, a canal in Croatia